The Manhattan Maroons were a minor league baseball team based in Manhattan, Kansas. From 1909 to 1911, the Maroons played as members of the Class D level Central Kansas League and were followed in the league by the 1912 Manhattan "Elks," before the franchise joined the 1913 Kansas State League. Manhattan teams hosted home games at Athletic Park from 1909 to 1911, before moving to Southside Park.

History
Manhattan, Kansas first hosted minor league baseball when the Manhattan "Maroons" began play in 1909. The Maroons began play as members of the eight–team Class D level Central Kansas League. The Maroons ended the 1909 season with a record of 16–54, placing 8th and last in the league. Earle Bryant, Joe Bond and Pat Murphy served as managers as the Maroons finished 29.5 games behind the 1st place Ellsworth Blues in the final standings.

The Manhattan Maroons placed 6th in the 1910 Central Kansas League. Playing the season under managers Frank Gardiner and Al Strong, the Maroons finished with a final record of 35–43, finishing 16.5 games behind the 1st place Ellsworth Blues.

The 1911 Manhattan Maroons continued play as the Central Kansas League reduced to four teams. Manhattan ended the 1911 season with a record of 28–43, placing 4th in the four–team league. With Dee Poindexter as manager, Manhattan finished 19.0 games behind the champion Concordia Travelers.

The team became the Manhattan Elks in 1912, continuing Central Kansas League play. The team was also referred to as the "Giants." The Elks ended the 1912 season with a record of 52–38, placing 2nd in the six–team league. Manhattan was 2.0 games behind the 1st place Great Bend Millers in the final standings. Bob Kahl and Fred Moore served the Manhattan 1912 managers. The Central Kansas League permanently folded following the 1912 season.

In their final season of play, the 1913 Manhattan Elks folded during the season after joining a new league. Manhattan began the season as members of the six–team Class D level Kansas State League. The 1913 team was also referred to as the "Giants." On July 10, 1913, the Manhattan Elks folded from the Kansas State League with a record of 27–24. The Junction City Soldiers franchise had disbanded on July 9, 1910, causing Manhattan to be folded from the league on July 10, to keep an even number of teams. Fred Moore served as manager in Manhattan's final season of minor league play.

Manhattan, Kansas has not hosted another minor league team.

The ballparks
From 1909 to 1911, the Manhattan Maroons played minor league home games at Athletic Park. The ballpark had a capacity of 2,000.

In the 1912 and 1913 seasons, the Manhattan Elks teams played home minor league games at Southside Park. The ballpark also was called Eureka Electric Park.

Timeline

Year–by–year records

Notable alumni
George Aiton (1912)
Walt Alexander (1911)
Josh Billings (1912)
Gene Cocreham (1912)

See also
Manhattan Maroons playersManhattan Elks players

References

External links
 Baseball Reference

Defunct minor league baseball teams
Professional baseball teams in Kansas
Baseball teams established in 1909
Baseball teams disestablished in 1912
Defunct baseball teams in Kansas
Manhattan, Kansas
Riley County, Kansas
Pottawatomie County, Kansas
1909 establishments in Kansas
1912 disestablishments in Kansas
Central Kansas League teams